Notostira is a genus of true bugs belonging to the family Miridae.

The species of this genus are found in Europe.

Species:
 Notostira elongata (Geoffroy, 1785) 
 Notostira erratica (Linnaeus, 1758) 
 Notostira poppiusi Reuter, 1911 
 Notostira sibirica Golub, 1978

References

Miridae